Eastrington railway station serves the village of Eastrington in the East Riding of Yorkshire, England. The station, and all trains serving it are operated by Northern.

History
The station was opened 1 July 1840 by the Hull and Selby Railway. It was renamed on 1 July 1922 to "South Eastrington", as the village was also served by another station, known as "North Eastrington" on the now-disused Hull and Barnsley Railway. It was renamed back to Eastrington on 12 June 1961.

Facilities
The station is unstaffed and has no permanent buildings other than basic shelters (the former station house is now a private residence).  No ticketing facilities are offered, so all tickets must be bought on the train or prior to travel.  Train running information can be obtained from timetable posters or a public telephone on platform 2.  Step-free access is available to both platforms via the automatic barrier level crossing at the eastern end.

Service
There is a very limited service from Eastrington, with one train a day eastbound to Hull and four trains a day westbound to York. There is no Sunday service.

References

External links 

Railway stations in the East Riding of Yorkshire
DfT Category F2 stations
Railway stations in Great Britain opened in 1840
Northern franchise railway stations
Former Hull and Selby Railway stations